Via Port Rotterdam, formerly Rotterdam Square, is a shopping mall located in Rotterdam, New York, United States. When it opened, the mall was originally called Rotterdam Square and owned by Wilmorite Properties (who also owned Wilton Mall in Wilton) until 2005, when Wilmorite was acquired by The Macerich Company, who then took over ownership and management of most of their properties. The mall was purchased by Kohan Retail Investment Group in January 2014, and was later sold to Via Properties in June 2015. In 2016, Via Properties renamed the mall to Via Port Rotterdam.

History
The mall is situated on a site once owned by the Vedder Family. Harmen Albertse Vedder of Schenectady bought the land in 1672 and built a home on it. In 1832 Harmens' great-grandson Johannes sold it to Colonel Daniel David Schermerhorn Campbell, who constructed a 26-bedroom mansion on the site.

At the time of construction, the area around the mall was a nature preserve, and environmental groups were concerned that the building of the mall would endanger wildlife and pollute the wet lands on the opposite side of Route 337, now the Great Flats Nature Trail and Preserve.

Mike Kohan bought the mall from Macerich in January 2014 for $8.5 million. 

In January 2015, Macy's, originally Hess's and later Filene's, announced that its store would be closing as part of a plan to close 14 stores nationwide. The space is now the location of a NYS taxation call center.

On February 12, 2015, local power company National Grid disconnected electric service due to a rumored $300,000.00 unpaid utility bill. The service was turned back on the next day.

In June 2015, the mall was sold for $9.25 million to Via Properties, which renamed the mall to Viaport Rotterdam in 2016. They plan to invest $10 million into mall improvements, including exterior upgrades, a  aquarium, and a nearly  entertainment center with a bowling alley, sports bar, restaurant, and arcade.

On April 21, 2016, it was announced that Sears would also be closing as part of a plan to close 78 stores nationwide. The store closed in July 2016.

On October 15, 2018, Sears Holdings announced that Kmart would be closing as well in December 2018 as part of a plan to close 142 stores nationwide which left the mall with no anchor stores left. As of January 2019, only several in-line tenants are remaining in Via Port Rotterdam as well as a call center for the New York State Department of Taxation and Finance.

Carousel

From 1988 until January 2007, Rotterdam Square featured a full-size Italian carousel in the food court. The management sold the carousel in late 2006 and in January 2007 it was dismantled and removed. The Carousel is currently operating at Southland Mall (Miami).

Graveyard
The mall features a graveyard within the complex. Located in a corner between the food court entrance and the front side entrance, the graveyard is the family cemetery of the Vedder Family dating back to around 1715.

Theater
A basic mall-based theater that was previously part of the Sony-Loews Cineplex (and then AMC) circuit. The theater was initially a six-screen cinema and is now operated by an independently owned theater company named Zurich Cinemas. The theater added a 7th screen and has been refitted with stadium seating, and digital projectors along with 3D capabilities. They also have some D-BOX seats.

Gallery

References

External links

 
 Zurich Cinemas

Shopping malls in New York (state)
Buildings and structures in Schenectady County, New York
Tourist attractions in Schenectady County, New York
Shopping malls established in 1988